Faubion Bowers (January 29, 1917 – November 17, 1999) was an American academic and writer in the area of Asian Studies, especially Japanese theatre. He also wrote the first full-length biography of Russian composer Alexander Scriabin. During the Allied Occupation of Japan, he was General Douglas MacArthur's personal Japanese language interpreter and aide-de-camp.

Biography
Bowers was born in Miami, Oklahoma. He graduated from Columbia University in 1935 and the Juilliard Graduate School of Music in 1939. Bowers taught at Hosei University in Tokyo from 1940 to 1941.

After the surrender of Japan, he was the interpreter for the advance party of 150 US personnel which flew into the Atsugi airfield on August 28, 1945. As MacArthur's interpreter he lived at the American Embassy with the MacArthur family, and served as interpreter at the initial meeting between MacArthur and Emperor Hirohito. While an official censor for Japanese theater he became its champion.

After the war he taught at the New School for Social Research, and at the University of Kansas as Distinguished Professor of Asian Studies. He also served as music editor or reviewer for various periodicals.

Bowers became a respected authority on Asian art and culture, writing scholarly monographs on such subjects as Indian dance and Japanese theatre, as well as a definitive two-volume biography of the Russian composer Alexander Scriabin.  His book, Japanese Theatre, was published in 1952 and is highly recommended by James Michener, in his book on Japanese ukiyo-e prints, The Floating World, as "one of the foremost works of scholarship dealing with Japanese culture to come out of the occupation."

He was married from 1951–1966 to Indian writer Santha Rama Rau. They had one son who, according to his parents, traveled widely and lived an affluent vagabond existence.

Bowers was interviewed for Columbia University's Oral History Project in 1960. He wrote the first full-length biography of Russian composer Alexander Scriabin (1872–1915) in two volumes (1970, 2nd edition 1996) and was a member of the Bagby Foundation for the Musical Arts in New York City. He died in New York City on November 17, 1999.

Kabuki
Bowers is known as The Man Who Saved Kabuki in Japan. While on his way to Indonesia in 1940, he visited Tokyo's Kabuki-za where he watched the famous Kanadehon Chūshingura kabuki play, and was very moved by kabuki as an art form. Four years later he returned to Japan as General MacArthur's secretary during the American Occupation of Japan. At this time the Supreme Commander of the Allied Powers thought kabuki should be banned for its portrayal of feudal values. Bowers was strongly against this, stating that "Kabuki is not only Japanese culture but world culture and must be preserved for the future." He promoted kabuki plays and instructed that a "Dream Team" cast of big kabuki stars should be assembled to perform "Kanadehon Chūshingura" in 1947. This performance and many others performed at the Tokyo Army College were a success, and the cast later performed the play in 1950 in East Coast venues across the US.

Awards
Bowers was awarded the Bronze Star in 1944, and an Oak Leaf Cluster in 1945.

In 1985, Bowers was awarded the Order of the Sacred Treasure by the government of Japan.

Publications

 
 
 
 

 

 

 

 

 

 
 

 

  (1st pub. 1970)

Notes

References
 Brandon, James R. "Myth and Reality: A Story of Kabuki during American Censorship, 1945-1949," ''Asian Theatre Journal, Volume 23, Number 1, Spring 2006, pp. 1–110.
 Okamoto, Shiro. "The Man Who Saved Kabuki: Faubion Bowers and Theatre Censorship in Occupied Japan," translation by Samuel L. Leiter.  Honolulu: University of Hawai'i Press.

External links
Faubion Bowers - biography found at the Japanese American Veterans Association website
Bowers' impressions of Gen. MacArthur  as found on the Japanese-American Veterans Association website
1969 audio interview of Faubion Bowers (part 1 of 2)
1969 audio interview of Faubion Bowers (part 2 of 2)
1969 'Camera Three' program on Kabuki (with Faubion Bowers et al.)

1917 births
1999 deaths
American expatriates in Japan
Recipients of the Order of the Sacred Treasure
Writers from Oklahoma
Columbia College (New York) alumni
Juilliard School alumni
Douglas MacArthur
Interpreters
Censors
University of Kansas faculty
The New School faculty
20th-century scholars
20th-century American writers
Kabuki
American people of World War II
Academic staff of Hosei University
20th-century translators